Jaume Doménech Sánchez (born 5 November 1990) is a Spanish professional footballer who plays for Valencia CF as a goalkeeper.

He made over 100 appearances for Valencia, where he was mainly used as back-up.

Club career
Born in Almenara, Castellón, Valencian Community, Doménech played youth football with Villarreal CF. He played for the C team after being loaned to CD Onda for one year.

In the summer of 2013, after brief spells with CD El Palo and Huracán Valencia CF, Doménech signed for Valencia CF, and was assigned to the reserves in Segunda División B. In both of his seasons, the side narrowly avoided relegation with him as first choice.

Doménech was promoted to the main squad for the 2015–16 campaign by manager Nuno Espírito Santo. On 12 September, profiting from injuries to both Diego Alves and Mathew Ryan, he played his first match in La Liga, a 1–0 away win against Sporting de Gijón where he put in a player of the match performance. The following day, the club announced he had renewed his contract until 2018.

Doménech was backup to another Brazilian, Neto, in 2017–18. He started in the team's semi-final run in the Copa del Rey, notably saving two penalties in the shootout against Deportivo Alavés in the quarter-finals. In the following edition of the tournament he appeared in every game for the winners, including the 2–1 victory over FC Barcelona in the final. On 18 May 2019, he made a rare league appearance on the last day of the season away to Real Valladolid, keeping a clean sheet in a 2–0 win to qualify for the UEFA Champions League.

Doménech signed new contracts in September 2016 and November 2019, tying him to Valencia until 2023 and enacting a buyout clause of €50 million. In the summer of 2020, the club wanted to offload his competitor Jasper Cillessen due to financial problems but this never transpired; nonetheless, in the ensuing season he played the majority of league games for the first time due to the Dutchman's injuries.

Third-choice to new signing Giorgi Mamardashvili and Cillessen during the 2021–22 campaign, Doménech became a backup after the latter left, but suffered a serious knee injury on 8 September 2022. The following day, he further extended his contract until 2025.

Career statistics

Honours
Valencia
Copa del Rey: 2018–19

References

External links

Valencia official profile

1990 births
Living people
People from Plana Baixa
Sportspeople from the Province of Castellón
Spanish footballers
Footballers from the Valencian Community
Association football goalkeepers
La Liga players
Segunda División B players
Tercera División players
Villarreal CF C players
CD El Palo players
Huracán Valencia CF players
Valencia CF Mestalla footballers
Valencia CF players